"I'm Movin' On" is a song written by Phillip White and D. Vincent Williams and recorded by American country music group Rascal Flatts. It was released in October 2001 as the fourth and final single from the band’s self-titled debut album. The song reached number 4 on the U.S. Billboard Hot Country Songs chart in early 2002.

Content
"I'm Movin' On" is a mid-tempo ballad in triple meter, accompanied by mandolin and piano. In it, the narrator starts off with stating of the troubles he's had ("I've dealt with my ghosts and I've faced all my demons"). He states that he is "at peace" with himself because he is moving out of the town in which he lives ("I never dreamed home would end up where I don't belong / I'm movin' on"). However, this could also refer to an emotional state—as in a relationship he once believed to be his "emotional" home has become a place he doesn't "belong" in.

Gary LeVox said of the song, "[It's]  a song that just drains everything out of you."

Recording
While recording the song and trying to perfect the vocals, LeVox would often get choked up with emotion. "I was getting choked up recording it after singing it over and over and trying to get it right." According to Joe Don Rooney, "D. Vincent and Phillip [the writers] came in and listened to the final mix.  D. Vincent had been having some tough times when he wrote that song.  When he got up, he was walking out and said, 'Boys, I got to get me a beer. That one hit too close to home. But I do love it.'  He shook our hands and walked out.  That was very, very touching."

Critical reception
The song won the Song of the Year award at the 38th annual Academy of Country Music awards, at which Rascal Flatts also won Top Vocal Group. Joe Don Rooney, Rascal Flatts' lead guitarist, said in an interview with USA Weekend that he considers the song an example of how the band interacts with their fans: "One time, a guy told us he was addicted to drugs and was considering suicide, then he heard our song 'I'm Movin' On.' He didn't say that the song alone changed his life. But it opened his mind to the thought that he could change his life, and he did."

Music video
A music video directed by Shaun Silva was released for the song. It debuted on November 16, 2001 during CMT Most Wanted Live. The video features footage of a live performance of the song, mixed with scenes of instruments being played and various views of the band members going about their daily lives. DeMarcus is seen exiting an elevator and riding on a subway train, LeVox is frequently seen talking on the phone, and Rooney is shown in a tattoo parlor. Throughout the video, the colors of everything change frequently.

Chart performance
"I'm Movin' On" debuted at number 57 on the U.S. Billboard Hot Country Singles & Tracks for the chart week of October 13, 2001.

Year-end charts

References

2001 singles
2000 songs
Rascal Flatts songs
Music videos directed by Shaun Silva
Country ballads
Song recordings produced by Mark Bright (record producer)
Songs written by D. Vincent Williams
Lyric Street Records singles